The Saturn Award for Best Action or Adventure Film (formerly Saturn Award for Best Action, Adventure or Thriller Film from 1994 to 2009) is an award presented to the best film in the action, adventure or thriller genres by the Academy of Science Fiction, Fantasy and Horror Films.

Best Action/Adventure/Thriller Film

Winners and nominees

1990s

2000s

Best Action/Adventure Film

Winners and nominees

2010s

2020s

External links
Official Site
Internet Movie Database: 21st, 22nd, 23rd, 24th, 25th, 26th, 27th, 28th, 29th, 30th, 31st, 32nd, 33rd, 34th, 35th, 36th, 37th, 38th, 39th, 40th, 41st, 42nd, 43rd

Action or Adventure Film